Milk and Cookies may refer to:

 Milk and Cookies, Marvel Superheroes from What The--%3F! comic
 "Milk and Cookies", a song by Melanie Martinez from the 2015 album Cry Baby
 Milk 'N' Cookies, an American band